Ludwig VII may refer to:

 Louis VII, Duke of Bavaria (c. 1368–1447)
 Louis VII, Landgrave of Hesse-Darmstadt (1658–1678)